Petrotilapia is a genus of cichlids endemic to Lake Malawi.

Species
There are currently 10 recognized species in this genus:
 Petrotilapia chrysos Stauffer & van Snik, 1996
 Petrotilapia flaviventris Lundeba, Stauffer & Konings, 2011
 Petrotilapia genalutea A. C. Marsh, 1983
 Petrotilapia microgalana Ruffing, A. Lambert & Stauffer, 2006
 Petrotilapia mumboensis Lundeba, Stauffer & Konings, 2011
 Petrotilapia nigra A. C. Marsh, 1983
 Petrotilapia palingnathos Lundeba, Stauffer & Konings, 2011
 Petrotilapia pyroscelos Lundeba, Stauffer & Konings, 2011
 Petrotilapia tridentiger Trewavas, 1935
 Petrotilapia xanthos Lundeba, Stauffer & Konings, 2011

References 

 
Haplochromini

Cichlid genera
Taxa named by Ethelwynn Trewavas
Taxonomy articles created by Polbot